Gombe Stream National Park is a national park in Kigoma District of Kigoma Region in Tanzania,  north of Kigoma, the capital of Kigoma Region. Established in 1968, it is one of the smallest national parks in Tanzania, with only  of protected land along the hills of the eastern shore of Lake Tanganyika. The terrain is distinguished by steep valleys, and the vegetation ranges from grassland to woodland to tropical rainforest. Accessible only by boat, the park is most famous as the location where Jane Goodall pioneered her behavioural research on the common chimpanzee populations. The Kasakela chimpanzee community, featured in several books and documentaries, lives in Gombe National Park.

Besides chimpanzees, primates inhabiting Gombe Stream National Park include beachcomber olive baboons, red colobus, red-tailed monkeys, blue monkeys, and vervet monkeys. Red-tailed monkeys and blue monkeys have also been known to hybridize in the area. The park is also home to over 200 bird species and bushpigs. There are also many species of snakes, and occasional hippopotami and African leopards.

Jane Goodall

Jane Goodall first travelled to Tanzania in 1960 at the age of 26 with no formal college training.  At the time, it was accepted  that humans were undoubtedly similar to chimpanzees, sharing over 98% of the same genetic code.  However, little was known about chimpanzee behaviour or community structure. At the time she began her research, she says “it was not permissible, at least not in ethological circles, to talk about an animal's mind. Only humans had minds. Nor was it quite proper to talk about animal personality. Of course, everyone knew that they did have their own unique characters--everyone who had ever owned a dog or other pet was aware of that. But ethologists, striving to make theirs a "hard" science, shied away from the task of trying to explain such things objectively.”  However, her research eventually proved just that—the intellectual and emotional sophistication of non-humans, chimpanzees in particular.  With the support of renowned anthropologist Louis Leakey, Goodall set up a small research station in Gombe in hopes of learning more about the behaviour of our closest relatives.  There she spent months tracking the elusive chimpanzee troops, particularly the Kasekela chimpanzee community, and observing their daily habits until she was slowly accepted by one troop and was allowed rare and intimate glimpses into chimpanzee society.

Research findings

Without college training directing her research, Goodall observed things that strict scientific doctrines may have overlooked. Instead of numbering the chimpanzees she observed, she gave them names such as Fifi and David Greybeard, and observed them to have unique and individual personalities, an unconventional idea at the time. She found that "it isn’t only human beings who have personality, who are capable of rational thought [and] emotions like joy and sorrow".  She also observed behaviours such as hugs, kisses, pats on the back, and even tickling, what people consider identifiable human actions. Goodall insists that these gestures are evidence of “the close, supportive, affectionate bonds that develop between family members and other individuals within a community, which can persist throughout a life span of more than 50 years.”  These findings suggest similarities between humans and chimpanzees exist in more than genes alone but can be seen in emotion, intelligence, and family and social relationships.

Goodall’s research at Gombe is best known to the scientific community for challenging two long-standing beliefs of the day: that only humans could construct and use tools, and that chimpanzees were passive vegetarians. While observing one chimpanzee feeding at a termite mound, she watched him repeatedly place stalks of grass into termite holes, then remove them from the hole covered with clinging termites, effectively “fishing” for termites.  The chimps would also take twigs from trees and strip off the leaves to make the twig more effective, a form of object modification which is the rudimentary beginnings of toolmaking.  Humans had long distinguished ourselves from the rest of the animal kingdom as "Man the Toolmaker". In response to Goodall’s revolutionary findings, Louis Leakey wrote, "We must now redefine man, redefine tool, or accept chimpanzees as human!"  Over the course of her study, Goodall found evidence of mental traits in chimpanzees such as reasoned thought, abstraction, generalization, symbolic representation, and even the concept of self, all previously thought to be uniquely human abilities.

In contrast to the peaceful and affectionate behaviours she observed, Goodall also found an aggressive side of chimp nature at Gombe.  She discovered that chimps will systematically hunt and eat smaller primates, such as colobus monkeys. Goodall watched a hunting group isolate a colobus monkey high in a tree and block all possible exits, then one chimpanzee climbed up and captured and killed the colobus.  The others then each took parts of the carcass, sharing with other members of the troop in response to begging behaviours.  The chimps at Gombe kill and eat as much as one-third of the colobus population in the park each year.  This alone was a major scientific find which challenged previous conceptions of chimp diet and behaviour.

But perhaps more startling, and disturbing, was the tendency for aggression and violence within chimpanzee troops.  Goodall observed dominant females deliberately killing the young of other females in the troop in order to maintain their dominance, sometimes going so far as cannibalism.  She says of this revelation, “During the first ten years of the study I had believed […] that the Gombe chimpanzees were, for the most part, rather nicer than human beings. […] Then suddenly we found that chimpanzees could be brutal—that they, like us, had a darker side to their nature.” These findings revolutionized contemporary knowledge of chimpanzee diet and feeding behaviours, and were further evidence of the social similarities between humans and chimpanzees, albeit in a much darker manner.

Gombe Stream Research Centre

Goodall lived at Gombe almost full-time for fifteen years and the long-term data she accumulated is still of value to scientists today.  In 1967, the Gombe Stream Research Centre (GSRC) was established to coordinate ongoing chimpanzee research in the park.  Run mostly by a team of trained Tanzanians, the GSRC is the longest-running field study of an animal species in their natural surroundings, now over 60 years.  This long-term data has provided scientists with insight into chimpanzee demographic patterns, male politics, hunting, culture and mother-infant relationships over multiple generations—rare and valuable data.  The ongoing research is also providing information on the current threats to chimpanzees, such as disease, poaching, and habitat disturbance, which affect other species at Gombe as well. The research of Goodall has also drastically changed ethological thinking and how behavioural studies are conducted.  Where once talk of animal emotion was dismissed as anthropomorphism, her observations of animals in their natural habitat show that societies, behaviour, and relationships between animals are quite complex.  Her research of chimpanzee habitat (food and other requirements) also aid in improved design for new protected areas. The GSRC also conducts research on the baboon population, led by the Jane Goodall Center for Primate Studies.  Research from the GSRC has resulted in 35 Ph.D. theses, over 400 papers and 30 books.

Conservation

The biodiversity of Gombe National Park is primarily threatened by human encroachment. Although 25% of Tanzania is set aside in parks and reserves, wildlife populations are still declining.  This is mainly due to the lack of collaboration between park management, government sectors, and rural communities.  Village lands often lie between parks and become obstacles for animals traveling between protected areas.  Without incentives to protect the animals, rural communities will hunt them for food or kill them for safety reasons. Poverty also increases the demand.

See also
USC Jane Goodall Research Center
List of protected areas of Tanzania
Tanzania National Parks Authority
Gombe Chimpanzee War

Notes and references

External links

Official website
Tanzania tourist board
Ape site at UCSD 
Explore - Street View, Google Maps

National parks of Tanzania
Geography of Kigoma Region
Lake Tanganyika
Miombo
Jane Goodall
Protected areas established in 1968
1968 establishments in Tanzania
Tourist attractions in the Kigoma Region
Central Zambezian miombo woodlands